Bùi Thúy An (born 5 October 1990) is a Vietnamese footballer who plays as a defender for Women's Championship club Hà Nội I. She has been a member of the Vietnam women's national team.

References

1990 births
Living people
Women's association football defenders
Vietnamese women's footballers
Vietnam women's international footballers
Asian Games competitors for Vietnam
Footballers at the 2010 Asian Games
Footballers at the 2018 Asian Games
Southeast Asian Games gold medalists for Vietnam
Southeast Asian Games medalists in football
Competitors at the 2017 Southeast Asian Games
21st-century Vietnamese women